Christian Jentschke (born 20 November 1993) is an professional German darts player currently playing in Professional Darts Corporation events.

Jentschke first qualified for a PDC European Tour event in 2019, the 2019 International Darts Open, where he lost 6-3 to Justin Pipe in the first round.

References

Living people
German darts players
Professional Darts Corporation associate players
1993 births
Sportspeople from Mannheim
21st-century German people